Harry Lee Hudspeth (born December 28, 1935) is a former United States district judge of the United States District Court for the Western District of Texas.

Education and career

Born in Dallas, Texas, Hudspeth received an Artium Baccalaureus degree from the University of Texas at Austin in 1955 and a Juris Doctor from the University of Texas School of Law in 1958.  While a student at UT, he was a member of the Alpha Phi Omega Service Fraternity and the Friar Society. He was a corporal in the United States Marine Corps Reserve from 1958 to 1959. He was a trial attorney of the United States Department of Justice in Washington, D.C. from 1959 to 1962, and was then an Assistant United States Attorney of the Western District of Texas from 1962 to 1969. He was in private practice in El Paso, Texas from 1969 to 1977. From 1977 to 1979, he was a United States Magistrate for the Western District of Texas.

Federal judicial service

On October 11, 1979, Hudspeth was nominated by President Jimmy Carter to a seat on the United States District Court for the Western District of Texas vacated by Judge Adrian Anthony Spears. Hudspeth was confirmed by the United States Senate on November 26, 1979, and received his commission on November 27, 1979. He served as Chief Judge from 1992 to 1999. He assumed senior status on June 30, 2001. He retired from active service on January 31, 2016.

References

Sources
 

1935 births
Living people
United States magistrate judges
Judges of the United States District Court for the Western District of Texas
United States district court judges appointed by Jimmy Carter
20th-century American judges
United States Marines
University of Texas alumni
University of Texas School of Law alumni
Assistant United States Attorneys
United States Department of Justice lawyers